RCAF Station Virden was a Second World War, Royal Canadian Air Force (RCAF) station. It was a British Commonwealth Air Training Plan (BCATP) flying training station located north of Virden, Manitoba, Canada. It is now the site of Virden/R.J. (Bob) Andrew Field Regional Aerodrome.

The runway is listed as a 3600' diameter, turf, all way field.

The station hosted No. 19 Elementary Flying Training School (19 EFTS). Flight instructors were civilian and were members of the Brandon-Virden Flying Club and the Moose Jaw Flying Club. Aircraft used include the de Havilland Tiger Moth and Fairchild Cornell. A relief (emergency) landing field was located near Lenore. No. 19 EFTS opened on May 16, 1941, and closed on December 15, 1944.

References

External links
 Hangar picture of Cornell aircraft
  Retrieved 2012-3-8
 No. 19 Elementary Flying Training School Retrieved 2012-3-8

Royal Canadian Air Force stations
Military airbases in Manitoba
Military history of Manitoba
Airports of the British Commonwealth Air Training Plan
Military installations closed in 1944